Kevin Graham Smart (born 17 October 1958) is an English retired footballer. He played professionally for Plymouth Argyle, and Wigan Athletic before moving into non-league football to play for Folkestone Town and Hythe Town.

In 2006, he was living in Dover and working as a bricklayer.

References

External links

1958 births
Living people
Footballers from Newcastle upon Tyne
English footballers
Association football defenders
Plymouth Argyle F.C. players
Wigan Athletic F.C. players
Folkestone F.C. players
Hythe Town F.C. players
English Football League players
British bricklayers